The National Sports Campus is a large site in the western suburbs of Dublin, Ireland, which contains a number of sporting facilities. It is operated by the National Sports Campus Development Authority and is home to a number of sports venues, including the National Indoor Arena, National Aquatic Centre, and National Horse Sport Arena. Several national sports governing bodies, including the Gaelic Athletic Association, have sports facilities on the campus. Other Irish sports governing bodies, such as the Football Association of Ireland and Sport Ireland, have their headquarters on the site.

Operations
The National Sports Campus Development Authority (NSCDA) was formally established on 1 January 2007 under the National Sports Campus Development Authority Act 2006. It was formed as a public body in Ireland, responsible for the creation, development, operation and promotion of a National Sports Campus.

The authority also has responsibility for the operation of the National Aquatic Centre on the Blanchardstown site. Since May 2010. It discharges these responsibilities through its wholly owned subsidiary NSCDA (Operations) Ltd.

Site
The National Sports Campus is in the Abbotstown area of Blanchardstown, in the western suburbs of Dublin. The 477 acre site is in the townland of Sheephill near Abbotstown House. This area was formerly "mainly open farmland" and previously accommodated the Marine Institute, State Laboratory and a farm operated by the Department of Agriculture.

Development

The National Sports Campus Development Authority allocated a number of plots on the site to accommodate the headquarters of the Football Association of Ireland (FAI), the Irish Institute of Sport (IIS) and the Irish Sport HQ. The latter is home to the administrative headquarters of 19 national governing bodies of sport in Ireland. The FAI moved from its former headquarters on Merrion Square in Dublin city centre, to its new offices on the National Sports Campus, in late 2007.

In October 2013, the NSCDA completed the development of high performance training facilities for athletes in a variety of sporting disciplines including modern pentathlon, fencing, pistol-shooting, and gymnastics. An equestrian centre, the National Horse Sport Arena, was also developed.

In 2016, the Gaelic Athletic Association opened a National Games Development Centre within the confines of the National Sports Campus site. This facility includes several grass and artificial pitches, a pavilion with dressing rooms, a gym, and conference and dining facilities.

The NSCDA has also allocated sites for potential future development in partnership with the governing organisations responsible for cycling, rugby and hockey. For example, in March 2015, Fingal County Council gave planning permission for an indoor velodrome to be constructed as part of the National Sports Campus. While the track was originally projected to be completed before the 2020 Summer Olympics, construction was delayed. In September 2020, it was reported that representatives of Cycling Ireland were "hopeful" that the velodrome would be ready "in time for preparations for the 2024 Paris Olympics".

Sport Ireland announced development plans in November 2022, with a velodrome and cricket venues included.

See also
 National Sports Centre (disambiguation)

References

Sports venues in County Dublin
Indoor arenas in Ireland